The Tour is a live recording album by American R&B singer Mary J. Blige, released July 28, 1998. The album was recorded from two shows in Los Angeles at the Universal Amphitheater during her Share My World Tour in 1997-1998 in the U.S.

Critical reception 
In a contemporary review for Rolling Stone, Jancee Dunn wrote that The Tour "deftly captures the energy and exuberance" of Blige's live shows while calling the singer "a commanding, self-assured performer" who "plays her audience like a damn fiddle". Entertainment Weekly critic Matt Diehl said while the arrangements were occasionally overwrought, Blige compensated with passionate vocals and impressive covers of classic soul songs, "blending motifs into each other like an expert DJ". Robert Christgau deemed the record Blige's "de facto best-of" in The Village Voice; he explained in 2003 why it remained his favorite album of hers:

Chart performance

Track listing
"Intro"
"Real Love"
"You Remind Me"
"Reminisce"
"Sweet Thing"
"Mary Jane (All Night Long)"
"Love No Limit"
"Summer Madness"
"My Life"
"You Gotta Believe"
"Slow Down"
"Mary's Joint"
"I'm the Only Woman"
"Share My World"
"I'm Goin' Down"
"Thank You Lord"
"I Can Love You"
"Keep Your Head" (with Dustin Adams)
"Everything"
"Seven Days"
"Not Gon' Cry"
"Missing You"
"Day Dreaming"
"Misty Blue"
"A Dream" (Japanese Bonus Track)

Personnel

Musicians 
Mary J. Blige - Main Performer, Vocals
Lanar Brantley - Musical Direction
Benny Pough - Introduction Announcer
Dustin Adams - Vocals (Background), Performer
Paulette McWilliams - Vocals (Background)
Joya Owens - Vocals (Background)
Audrey Wheeler - Vocals (Background)
Angel Rogers - Vocals (Background)
Sharon Bryant-Gallaway - Vocals (Background)
Chantell Jones - Vocals (Background)
Michelle Matlock - Vocals (Background)
Cindy Mizelle - Vocals (Background)
Lanar Brantley - Bass
Michael Clemons - Drums
Jeff Motley - Keyboards
Luke Austin - Keyboards
Loren Dawson - Keyboards

Production
Mary J. Blige - producer
Lanar Brantley - producer
Kirk Burrowes - Executive Producer
Hank Shocklee - Executive Producer
LaTonya Blige-DaCosta - Associate Executive Producer
Lanar Brantley - mixing
Larry Alexander - mixing
Hank Shocklee - mixing
Greg Pinto - Mixing Assistant
Larry Alexander - sequencing
Tom Coyne - mastering
Chuck Orozco - engineering
Larry Alexander - engineering
John Protozko - engineering
Booker T. Jones III - engineering
Jeff Keese - engineering
Scott Peets - engineering

References

External links 
 

Mary J. Blige albums
1998 live albums
Live contemporary R&B albums